Douglas E. Winter (born October 30, 1950, in St. Louis, Missouri) is an American writer, critic and lawyer.

Winter grew up in Granite City, Illinois. He graduated from Harvard Law School in 1975 and became a lawyer in Washington, DC, currently working as Of  Counsel/Director of Analytics Review Technology at internationally based law firm Bryan Cave Leighton Paisner LLP, concentrating on complex litigation, information management, electronic discovery, and entertainment law. Winter has also taught legal writing at the University of Iowa.

A lifelong interest in horror has led him to develop a parallel career as horror writer and horror critic. Winter edited horror anthologies Prime Evil (1988) and Revelations (1997) as well as the Hugo Award-nominated and World Fantasy Award-winning interviews collection Faces of Fear (1985, revised 1990). He has also written the authorized critical biographies of Stephen King and Clive Barker. His novel Run (2000) was selected as the Best Suspense Novel of the Year by the Book of the Month Club and was nominated for the World Mystery Award. His experimental novella Splatter: A Cautionary Tale (1987) was nominated for the World Fantasy Award. His short story Black Sun, illustrated by Stephen R. Bissette, won the International Horror Award. Other short fiction has been nominated for the Bram Stoker Award, the World Fantasy Award, and the International Horror Award.  

Winter was book review columnist for Fantasy Review, Weird Tales, Cemetery Dance, and The Magazine of Fantasy & Science Fiction.  He wrote more than 150 soundtrack review columns for Video Watchdog.  His reviews have appeared in such major metropolitan newspapers as the Washington Post, the Washington Times, the Atlanta Journal-Constitution, and the Cleveland Plain Dealer, and in magazines as diverse as Saturday Review, Harper's Bazaar, Fangoria, Gallery, and Twilight Zone.  He is a member of the National Book Critics Circle.

Publications

Editor
Shadowings: The Reader’s Guide to Horror Fiction (1983)
Prime Evil (1988) Nominated for the World Fantasy Award
Revelations (1997) Nominated for the World Fantasy Award; Winner of the International Horror Award

Books
Stephen King: The Art of Darkness (1984) 
Faces of Fear (1985) Winner of the World Fantasy Award; nominated for the Hugo Award
Splatter: A Cautionary Tale (1987) Nominated for the World Fantasy Award
Black Sun (1994) Winner of the International Horror Award
Run (2000)  Book of the Month Club Best Suspense novel of 2000; nominated for the World Mystery Award and the Bram Stoker Award for Best First Novel
Clive Barker: The Dark Fantastic (2001) 
A Little Brass Book of Full Metal Fiction (2004)

See also
 Winter (name)

References

External links
 Winter at Fantastic Fiction
 Winter at Myspace

1950 births
Living people
Harvard Law School alumni
University of Iowa faculty
World Fantasy Award-winning writers
American male writers